John Richards (2 April 1780 – 9 June 1847) was an English politician who sat in the House of Commons between 1832 and 1837.

Life
Richards was from Wassell Grove in the parish of Hagley, Worcestershire. He served as  MP for Knaresborough in Yorkshire  between  December 1832 and 1837, and became High Sheriff of Worcestershire in 1844.

There is a wall tablet commemorating him in St John the Baptist Church, Hagley.

References

External links 
 

1780 births
1847 deaths
Members of the Parliament of the United Kingdom for English constituencies
UK MPs 1832–1835
UK MPs 1835–1837
High Sheriffs of Worcestershire